Muhammad Sharin bin Sapien (born 12 April 1994) also known as Potek by local fans is a Malaysian footballer who plays for Terengganu FC in the Malaysia Super League as a central midfielder.

References

External links

1994 births
Living people
People from Terengganu
Malaysian footballers
Terengganu F.C. II players
Terengganu FC players
Association football midfielders
Malaysian people of Malay descent